The Taj Mahal Marathon is a long-distance running event, held in Agra, India every year. The running event first started  on Friday, 14 June 2013 and continues every year.

Overview
The race was founded by India's youngest ultra marathon runner, and an engineer, Gaurav Madan. Set over a largely flat course around the Chambal River and River Yamuna, the race begins at three separate points around Taj Mahal, Agra and finishes in Bhangarh, Rajasthan. In addition to being one of the top ten international marathons to run as per Lonely Planet across the globe, this crew supported marathon is also India's longest in terms of the distance.

History 
The Taj Mahal Marathon is not the city's first long-distance running event, which begins around the Taj Mahal. Adventure Marathon organized the Taj Mahal Marathon in 2008 and then discontinued it. It was a 42.195-kilometer marathon. The route began in the small village of Niyamatpur and wound through the countryside before joining the main highway to Agra, the home of the Taj Mahal.

The course
Set over a largely flat course along the Chambal River from River Yamuna, and spanning 222 kilometres (138 miles), The Taj Mahal Marathon is regarded as a tough and unpredictable event, and only for the grown ups. A prior experience of running on highways along with traffic is highly recommended. 
 
The course begins from three points: Eastern Gate, Southern Gate and Western Gate of Taj Mahal and lead the runners to NH 11 towards Jaipur, that takes runners to Bharatpur, Rajasthan via Fatehpur Sikri. The course provides runners the opportunity to run along the Keoladeo National Park or Keoladeo Ghana National Park formerly known as the Bharatpur Bird Sanctuary, which is a famous avifauna sanctuary that plays host to thousands of birds especially during the winter season. Over 230 species of birds are known to have made the National Park their home. It is also a declared World Heritage Site. Bhangarh is an isolated colossal town in India that is famous for its historical haunted ruins. It is in the Rajgarh municipality of the Alwar district in the state of Rajasthan. Bhangarh is at the edge of the Sariska Tiger Reserve. The modern village has a population of 1,306 in 200 households. Bhangarh is also a popular tourist attraction with desert vegetation and wildlife keeping this graveyard alive.

After crossing Bharatpur, the course leads the runners to city of Dausa, Rajasthan far from the infamous ravines of Chambal River. The weather on partially deserted landscape is considerably hot in month of June with daytime temperature rising above 116 degrees Fahrenheit. In Dausa, runners join National Highway 11A Dausa Highway that leads them to the finish at Bhangarh, Alwar, Rajasthan.

Though course from Start to Finish is flat on map, the runners scale a distance of 222 kilometres during the marathon passing the three mandatory checkpoints: Bharatpur, Mehandipur Balaji Temple and Dausa with gross elevation gain of 2000 ft. During the entire duration of the marathon, runners will be accompanied by their mandatory support crew along with support vehicle and Medical Support Team.

The marathon has a cut-off time of 48 hours from the start, with no individual time station cut-offs.

Eligibility and participation
The race attracts endured runners of all abilities across the globe challenging their physical limits with ultimate passion towards ultrarunning. There's an eligibility criteria for the participation in this extreme ultramarathon. The runner must be over 21 years of age and must have finished minimum of two ultramarathons: at least one of which must be over 100 km long. The participation is based on the official invitations released by the organizers. In order to receive the invitation, an interested runner can register on the official website to express the intent of participation.

See also
 Alwar
 Bhangarh
 Dausa
 Keoladeo National Park
 Sariska Tiger Reserve
 Taj Mahal

References

External links
Official website
Official map - splits given in kilometers

Recurring sporting events established in 2013
2013 establishments in Uttar Pradesh
June events
Sport in Uttar Pradesh
Agra
Athletics competitions in India